Baranovka is a rural locality (a khutor) in Baranovskoye Rural Settlement, Nikolayevsky District, Volgograd Oblast, Russia. The population was 145 as of 2010.

Geography 
Baranovka is located in steppe of Transvolga, 58 km east of Nikolayevsk (the district's administrative centre) by road. Krasny Meliorator is the nearest rural locality.

References 

Rural localities in Nikolayevsky District, Volgograd Oblast
Khvalynsky Uyezd